Edward James "Ted" Hodgson (born June 30, 1945) is a Canadian former professional ice hockey forward. He played four games in the National Hockey League for the Boston Bruins during the 1966–67 season. Hodgson also played 107 games in the World Hockey Association with the Cleveland Crusaders and Los Angeles Sharks between 1972 and 1974. The rest of his career, which lasted from 1965 to 1977, was spent in various minor leagues.

Hodgson was born in Hobbema, Alberta. He moved to England in 1996, and married Margret Julianne, who was originally from France.

Career statistics

Regular season and playoffs

External links
 

1945 births
Living people
Boston Bruins players
Buffalo Bisons (AHL) players
Canadian ice hockey forwards
Cleveland Crusaders players
Edmonton Oil Kings (WCHL) players
Estevan Bruins players
First Nations sportspeople
Ice hockey people from Alberta
Jacksonville Barons players
Los Angeles Sharks players
Minneapolis Bruins players
Oklahoma City Blazers (1965–1977) players
People from Ponoka County
Philadelphia Firebirds (NAHL) players
Roanoke Valley Rebels (SHL) players
Salt Lake Golden Eagles (WHL) players